Government College of Commerce, Chattogram is a government college in Agrabad, Chattogram, Bangladesh. It was established in 1947.

History
As a part of Govt. Commercial Institute, this college was built in 1947 in East Pakistan (now Bangladesh).

References

Colleges in Chittagong

Universities and colleges in Chittagong District